Lyde Browne may refer to:
Lyde Browne (antiquary) (died 1787), English antiquarian
Lyde Browne (officer) (died 1803), British Army officer